Rest Haven may refer to a location in the United States:

 Rest Haven, Georgia, a town
 Rest Haven, Illinois, a census-designated place
 Rest Haven Cemetery in Franklin, Tennessee; listed on the National Register of Historic Places